Gururajulu Naidu (1931–1985) was a Harikathe storyteller. He was known as Harikathe pitamaha of Karnataka, and along with Achyuta Dasa and Keshava Dasa, he formed the trinity of Harikatha Vidwans. Gururajulu Naidu's Harikathe stories include Renukadevi Mahatme, Bhookailasa, Bheema Jarasandha and Bhakta Sudama. He helped to popularise Harikathe in Karnataka by recording albums of the stories.

Gururajulu Naidu trained Harikatha to several disciples, including Shri N. Suryanarayanadas, Smt. Kumari Malini and LakshmanaDas. His harmonist was Vidwan Shivaramu.

Gururajulu Naidu was also known by the name Arun Kumar in the Kannada film industry. He acted in movies including Madhu Malathi, Hannele Chiguridaga and Mooroovare Vajragalu which co-starred Rajkumar. He also acted with Madhavi in Shivakanye. In Bangalore, in his honor, a roundabout is named by the municipality as "Gururajulu Naidu Vruttha".

His daughters also are Harikatha vidwans.

Style
Gururajulu Naidu's style of Harikathe was far removed from the slow and traditional style. It was fast-paced, interspersed with many humorous stories. Each Harikathe is about 90 minutes long. Though he has been criticised for this by the purists, Gururajulu Naidu's work was immensely popular. The content here is very less compared to the mahatma's true abilities.

Some of his popular performances are:
 Bhaktha Markendeya
 Bhaktha Siriyala
 MahiRavana
 Maya Bazaar
 Nallathanga Devi
 Gaja Gowri Vratha
 Shri Krishna Garudie
 Lava Kusha
 Nakku Nagisi Aluva Maresu
 Bhaktha Sudhama
 Bheema Jharasandha
 Girija Kalyana
 Mooruvare Vajragalu
 Kiratarjuna
 Sathya Harishchandra
 Uttarana Paurusha
 Chandrahaasa
 Maruthi Vijaya
 Santha Sakku Bhai
 Koluru Kodu Gusu
 Ayyappa Swamy
 Babru Vahana
 Muruvare Vajragalu
 Bhukailasa
 Nala Damayanthi
 Shani Prabhava
 The Ramayana (in four parts)
 Renuka Devi Mahathme
 Bhakta Kumbara
 Santha Ganeshwara

References

External links
http://www.kannadaaudio.com - website with audio recordings of Naidu

Indian storytellers
Artists from Karnataka
Indian male singers
Harikatha exponents
1931 births
Year of death unknown